The Taquari Extractive Reserve is an extractive reserve in the state of São Paulo, Brazil.
It protects a coastal area of mangroves.

Location

The Taquari Extractive Reserve is in the municipality of Cananéia, São Paulo.
The reserve covers an area of mangroves and salt water at the mouth of the Taquari River.

History

The Taquari Extractive Reserve was created by state law 12.810 of 21 February 2008.
This law broke up the old Jacupiranga State Park and created the Jacupiranga Mosaic with 14 conservation units.

Notes

Sources

Extractive reserves of Brazil
Protected areas of São Paulo (state)
Protected areas established in 2008
2008 establishments in Brazil